Neve Ziv (lit. Brightness Home), also known as Ziv HaGalil (lit. Brightness of the Galilee) is a community settlement in northern Israel. Located east of Nahariya, it falls under the jurisdiction of Ma'ale Yosef Regional Council.

History
The village was established in 2000 with the assistance of the Jewish Agency.

References

Community settlements
Populated places established in 2000
Populated places in Northern District (Israel)
2000 establishments in Israel